Kaido Kama (born 18 December 1957, Viljandi) is an Estonian politician, conservationist, and teacher. He served as the Minister of Justice of Estonia from 1992 to 1994, as well as Estonia's Minister of the Interior from 1994 to 1995.

Biography
Kama graduated from Viljandi 1st Secondary School in 1975. From 1975 to 1976, he studied architecture at the Estonian Academy of Arts. From 1982 to 1990, he worked as a conservation officer at Antsla Forest.

In 1990, Kama was elected to the Congress of Estonia. He was also a member of the Estonian Committee and the Estonian Constitutional Assembly (Estonian: Põhiseaduse Assamblee). In 1990, he was also a member of the Estonian Supreme Soviet at the time of Perestroika and the chairman of the Ownership Reform Commission. During the vote on the Estonian restoration of Independence, he was one of two members of the Soviet who did not register and walked out on the vote, the other being Klavdia Sergij. He was a member of the 1990 incarnation of the Estonian Conservative People's Party. In 1992, he was elected to the Riigikogu as a part of the Pro Patria National Coalition Party. He initially ran as part of The Right Wingers, but withdrew from the mandate.

Kama was the Minister of Justice during Mart Laar's term as prime minister from 1992 to 1994, as well as being the Minister of the Interior during Andres Tarand's term as prime minister from 1994 to 1995.

Kama has worked, among other things, as an advisor to former Prime Minister Juhan Parts, a counselor of the Ministry of Defense, as well as for the company Remedia and in Karula National Park.

From 1997 to 2004, Kama was the director of the Võru Institute.

Kama is also a noted conservationist, publishing numerous articles and interviews in support of conservationism in Estonia.

Personal life
Kama currently lives in Võru County and is a follower of Maausk. He has six children: sons Susi, Põvvat, Pikne, Mõtus Lõmaš, and daughters Kärg and Põim. Pikne is the director of the Valga Museum in Valga.

Awards
 4th Class of the Estonian Order of the National Coat of Arms (received 20 February 1998)
 Bernard Kangro Literary Prize (2002)

Works
 "Ümbreilma reisikirä", Fontese Publishing 2001,

References

External links
 Kaido Kama's lectures at the University of Life Sciences

1957 births
Living people
People from Viljandi
Members of the Riigikogu, 1992–1995
Members of the Riigikogu, 1995–1999
Justice ministers of Estonia
Ministers of the Interior of Estonia
Recipients of the Order of the National Coat of Arms, 4th Class
Estonian conservationists
Estonian modern pagans
20th-century Estonian politicians